Badminton at the 2011 Island Games was held from June 26 – July 1, 2011, at the Ryde High School Sports Hall.

Events

Medal table

Men

Women

Mixed

Team

Results

Men's singles

Finals

Bronze medal game

First round matches

Top half

Bottom half

Men's doubles

First round matches

Draw

Bronze medal game

Women's singles

Finals

Bronze medal game

First round matches

Top half

Bottom half
{{16TeamBracket-Compact-Tennis3-Byes | RD1=Second round
| RD2=Third round
| RD3=Quarterfinals
| RD4=Semifinals

| team-width=180
| score-width=15

| RD1-seed01=
| RD1-team01= Laura Beggs
| RD1-score01-1=21
| RD1-score01-2=21
| RD1-score01-3=
| RD1-seed02=
| RD1-team02= Kirstin Sineath
| RD1-score02-1=14
| RD1-score02-2=7
| RD1-score02-3=

| RD1-seed03=
| RD1-team03=
| RD1-score03-1=7
| RD1-score03-2=8
| RD1-score03-3=
| RD1-seed04=
| RD1-team04= Kiara Green
| RD1-score04-1=21
| RD1-score04-2=21
| RD1-score04-3=

| RD1-seed05=
| RD1-team05= Susanne Wahlborn
| RD1-score05-1=21
| RD1-score05-2=21
| RD1-score05-3=
| RD1-seed06=
| RD1-team06= Gillian Bushell
| RD1-score06-1=10
| RD1-score06-2=8
| RD1-score06-3=

| RD1-seed07=
| RD1-team07= Sevelanne Gordon
| RD1-score07-1=w/o
| RD1-score07-2=
| RD1-score07-3=
| RD1-seed08=
| RD1-team08= Rannva Carlsson
| RD1-score08-1=
| RD1-score08-2=
| RD1-score08-3=

| RD1-seed09=
| RD1-team09= Denise Insley
| RD1-score09-1=21
| RD1-score09-2=21
| RD1-score09-3=
| RD1-seed10=
| RD1-team10= Sofia Arkhipkina
| RD1-score10-1=10
| RD1-score10-2=10
| RD1-score10-3=

| RD1-seed11=
| RD1-team11= Hanna Age
| RD1-score11-1=7
| RD1-score11-2=1
| RD1-score11-3=
| RD1-seed12=
| RD1-team12= Caroline Gate
| RD1-score12-1=21
| RD1-score12-2=21
| RD1-score12-3=

| RD1-seed13=
| RD1-team13= Hedvig Broberg
| RD1-score13-1=21
| RD1-score13-2=21
| RD1-score13-3=
| RD1-seed14=
| RD1-team14= Cara Dunford
| RD1-score14-1=9
| RD1-score14-2=18
| RD1-score14-3=

| RD1-seed15=
| RD1-team15= Sarah Garbutt
| RD1-score15-1=14
| RD1-score15-2=16
| RD1-score15-3=
| RD1-seed16=
| RD1-team16= Kim Clague
| RD1-score16-1=21
| RD1-score16-2=21
| RD1-score16-3=

| RD2-seed01=
| RD2-team01= Laura Beggs
| RD2-score01-1=15
| RD2-score01-2=5
| RD2-score01-3=
| RD2-seed02=
| RD2-team02= Kiara Green
| RD2-score02-1=21
| RD2-score02-2=21
| RD2-score02-3=

| RD2-seed03=
| RD2-team03=
| RD2-score03-1=21
| RD2-score03-2=21
| RD2-score03-3=
| RD2-seed04=
| RD2-team04= Sevelanne Gordon
| RD2-score04-1=12
| RD2-score04-2=6
| RD2-score04-3=

| RD2-seed05=
| RD2-team05= Denise Insley
| RD2-score05-1=12
| RD2-score05-2=4
| RD2-score05-3=
| RD2-seed06=
| RD2-team06= Caroline Gate
| RD2-score06-1=21
| RD2-score06-2=21
| RD2-score06-3=

| RD2-seed07=
| RD2-team07= Hedvig Broberg
| RD2-score07-1=10
| RD2-score07-2=6
| RD2-score07-3=
| RD2-seed08=
| RD2-team08= Kim Clague
| RD2-score08-1=21
| RD2-score08-2=21
| RD2-score08-3=

| RD3-seed01=
| RD3-team01= Kiara Green
| RD3-score01-1=21
| RD3-score01-2=21
| RD3-score01-3=
| RD3-seed02=
| RD3-team02=
| RD3-score02-1=9
| RD3-score02-2=7
| RD3-score02-3=

| RD3-seed03=
| RD3-team03= Caroline Gate
| RD3-score03-1=21
| RD3-score03-2=13
| RD3-score03-3=18
| RD3-seed04=
| RD3-team04= Kim Clague
| RD3-score04-1=19
| RD3-score04-2=21
| RD3-score04-3=21

| RD4-seed01=
| RD4-team01=

Women's doubles

First round matches

Draw

Bronze medal game

Mixed doubles

Finals

Bronze medal game

First round matches

Top half

Bottom half

Team

Group A

Group B

Group C

Group D

Places 5–8

Places 9–12

Semifinals

Bronze medal game

Gold medal game

References

Badminton at the 2011 Island Games

2011 Island Games
Island Games
Badminton tournaments in England
2011